William Alexander Werbeniuk (14 January 1947 – 20 January 2003) was a Canadian professional snooker and pool player. Recognisable for his girth, he was nicknamed "Big Bill". Werbeniuk was a four-time World Championship quarter-finalist and also a UK Championship semi-finalist, reaching a career high world ranking of #8 for the 1983–84 season.

Early life
William Werbeniuk was born on 14 January 1947 in Winnipeg. His paternal grandfather had immigrated to Canada from Ukraine; his father, according to Werbeniuk, "was one of the biggest fences in Canada" and "committed armed robberies, peddled drugs, every larceny in the language." His father also owned Pop's Billiards on Logan Avenue in Winnipeg, where Werbeniuk began playing snooker as a child. Werbeniuk spent a portion of his youth travelling with Cliff Thorburn and playing pool for money.

Career
Werbeniuk won the Canadian Snooker Championship in 1973, with a 16–15 victory against Robert Paquette after being 12–15 behind. This qualified him for the North American Championship. He took the North American Championship title by defeating Cliff Thorburn 26–22, winning five of the last six frames after the pair were level at 21–21.

His playing record included an 9–8 quarter-final loss to John Pulman in the 1975 Canadian Open and quarter-final losses in the 1978 and 1979 World Championships to Ray Reardon and John Virgo respectively. He reached the semi-finals of the UK Championships (when it opened to non-UK based residents) but lost 9–3 to the reigning world champion Terry Griffiths. He suffered a third World quarter-final defeat to Reardon in 1981 by 13–10.

In the 1983 Lada Classic, Bill reached his first major final, but was beaten by Steve Davis 9–5. Werbeniuk again reached the quarter-finals of the World Championships, in the same year, losing 13–11 to Alex Higgins, and reached his second major final in the summer, losing 7–3 to compatriot Cliff Thorburn in the Winfield Masters in Australia.

Alcohol consumption
Werbeniuk was noted for the copious amounts of alcohol he consumed before and during matches – at least six pints before a match and then one pint for each frame. In total, he drank between 40 and 50 pints of lager per day. Doctors advised Werbeniuk to drink alcohol to counteract a familial benign essential tremor. Later in his career he also took propranolol, a beta blocker, to cope with the effects of his alcohol consumption on his heart.

Werbenuik was  reported  to have successfully claimed the cost of 6 pints of lager before every match as a tax deductible expense.

Some of Werbeniuk's alleged feats of drinking include:
76 cans of lager during a game with John Spencer in Australia in the 1970s;
43 pints of lager in a snooker match/drinking contest against Scotsman Eddie Sinclair in which, after Sinclair had passed out following his 42nd pint, Werbeniuk was reported to say "I'm away to the bar now for a proper drink"; 
28 pints of lager and 16 whiskies over the course of 11 frames during a match against Nigel Bond, in January 1990 – after which Werbeniuk then consumed an entire bottle of Scotch to "drown his sorrows" after losing the match.

Split trouser incident
A memorable incident occurred during a televised match against Dennis Taylor in the World Team Tournament. Werbeniuk tried to stretch across the table, but due to his size was having some difficulty. Eventually he split his trousers. The ripping noise it made caused many in the audience, including his opponent, to laugh out loud. Werbeniuk took it in good humour, asking the audience "who did that?" as if insinuating that the noise was attributed to flatulence.

Trick shots
In another incident, playing against Joe Johnson, Werbeniuk made what the announcer termed the "pot of the century" when he potted a long red by jumping the cue ball so that it bounced in front of and over an interposing red, knocking the object red in. Later in the match, he got an unusual fluke, when he missed a simple brown to the top corner, but it cannoned out of the pocket, off the opposite cushion and into the centre pocket on the same side.

Use of propranolol
Werbeniuk was ranked 8th in the world in 1983 and reached the quarter-finals of the World Snooker Championship four times before propranolol was banned in snooker competition, as it was classified as a performance-enhancing drug by the International Olympic Committee, the anti-doping rules of which were adopted by World Snooker. Werbeniuk said that his use was medicinal only and under doctor's orders, but was fined and sanctioned anyway.

His career effectively over, he returned to Vancouver, where he lived with his mother and brother. A bankruptcy order was filed against him in 1991, and he lived on disability benefits.

Death
Werbeniuk died of heart failure on 20 January 2003, six days after his 56th birthday.

Performance and rankings timeline

Career finals

Non-ranking finals: 4 (2 titles)

Team finals: 4 (1 title)

Amateur finals: 7 (5 titles)

References

External links

Werbeniuk's profile at Global Snooker Centre
The Life and Death of Bill Werbeniuk
Obituary in The Daily Telegraph

1947 births
2003 deaths
Canadian people of Ukrainian descent
Canadian pool players
Canadian snooker players
Sportspeople from Winnipeg